Annabelle Jane Carey (born 11 March 1989) was a New Zealand swimmer, who specialized in breaststroke events. As of 2006, she currently holds a New Zealand record of 1:09.26 in the 100 m breaststroke from the World Championship Trials in Auckland. In the same year she helped out the New Zealand team to pull off a fourth-place effort in the medley relay at the Commonwealth Games in Melbourne, Australia, with a record-breaking time of 4:06.30.

Carey qualified for two events as New Zealand's youngest swimmer (aged 15) at the 2004 Summer Olympics in Athens. She cleared a FINA B-standard entry time of 1:12.57 (100 m breaststroke) at the Olympic trials in Auckland. In the 100 m breaststroke, she challenged seven other swimmers in the third heat, including fellow 15-year-old Lee Ji-young of South Korea. She rounded out the field to last place and thirty-fifth overall by 0.28 of second, behind Lee in 1:13.21. She also teamed up with Hannah McLean, Elizabeth Coster, and Alison Fitch in the 4 × 100 m medley relay. Swimming the breaststroke leg in heat one, Carey recorded a time of 1:11.98, but the New Zealand team settled for sixth place and thirteenth overall in a final time of 4:10.37.

Carey also sought her second Olympic bid to compete for the New Zealand team in Beijing 2008. She was an all-time favorite in the national trials, campaigning for her second Olympic stint. In an all-important final, Carey lost her goggles upon diving in. She managed to finish in second place behind Zoe Baker, but missed out on an Olympic spot.

References

External links
NZ Olympic Team Profile

1989 births
Living people
New Zealand female swimmers
Olympic swimmers of New Zealand
Swimmers at the 2004 Summer Olympics
Swimmers at the 2006 Commonwealth Games
Female breaststroke swimmers
Sportspeople from Nelson, New Zealand
People educated at Burnside High School
Commonwealth Games competitors for New Zealand